AirX Charter is a private charter airline based in Malta.

Operations
AirX Charter holds a European air operator's certificate (AOC) in Malta and operates a fleet of 16 aircraft. AirX partners with a local operator in the United States who manages two Citation X’s. The Head Office is located in Malta, with other offices in London, U.K. AirX Jet Support is based in Stansted Airport and Malta and has two EASA Part-145 Certificate of Maintenance issued by EASA and maintains both the AirX fleet and third party aircraft.

Fleet

AirX operates the following aircraft:

 1 x Airbus A340-300 (as of Feb 2021)
 1 x Boeing B737-7BC (as of Apr 2022 - 9H-ELF)
 5 x Embraer Lineage 1000 (as of Jan 2022)
 7 x Bombardier Challenger 850 
 3 x Embraer Legacy 600 (as of Jan 2022)
 1 x Embraer Legacy 650

References

External links

AirX Charter

Airlines of Malta
Airlines established in 2011
Charter airlines